is a stable of sumo wrestlers, part of the Dewanoumi group of stables. It was established on April 1, 2018 by former ōzeki Miyabiyama, who branched off from Fujishima stable, taking five low ranked wrestlers with him. The stable is located in Tokorozawa, Saitama. As of January 2023, it had 14 wrestlers.

The stable's foreign recruit is former high school yokozuna Rōga who is of Russian and Mongolian heritage and made his debut in November 2018. He was promoted to the jūryō division following the September 2022 tournament.

In April 2021 the stable announced plans to move to Shibamata District, Katsushika, occupying the premises previously used by the now-defunct Azumazeki stable.

On 7 February 2023, Futagoyama stable, along with Ōshima stable and Kokonoe stable, signed a partnership and cooperation agreement with the Katsushika Ward of Tokyo. The agreement was presented as having the objective of cooperating further in a wide range of areas, including tourism, culture, sports, and educational promotion, and work closely to revitalize local communities.

Owners
 2018–Present: 14th Futagoyama Masataka (iin, former ōzeki Miyabiyama)

Notable active wrestlers

 (best rank jūryō)

Notable former wrestlers
None

Location and access
Kita-Iwaoka 366, Tokorozawa, Saitama
30 min walk from Shin-Tokorozawa station on Seibu Shinjuku Line

See also
List of sumo stables

References

External links 
Japan Sumo Association profile
Home Page

Active sumo stables